The 2016–17 Algerian Ligue Professionnelle 1was the 55th season of the Algerian Ligue Professionnelle 1 since its establishment in 1962. A total of 16 teams contested the league.

Teams

Stadiums

Personnel and kits

Managerial changes

Managerial changes during the 2016-17 campaign.

Pre-season

During the season

Foreign players

Results

League table

Result table

Positions by round

Clubs season-progress

Season statistics

Top scorers

Updated to games played on 14 June 2017 Source: soccerway.com

Top assists

Hat-tricks

Clean sheets

* Only goalkeepers who played all 90 minutes of a match are taken into consideration.
Updated to games played on 23 June 2017

Statistics referees

Media coverage

See also
2016–17 Algerian Ligue Professionnelle 2
2016–17 Algerian Cup

Notes 

On 20 August 2016 Indeed, the match RC Relizane - NA Hussein Dey has officially been deprogrammed. Neither the visiting team nor the officials could not reach the chamber of Stade Tahar Zoughari Relizane. "Cheer" premises have prevented access to teams and officials and protesting the non-qualification of new recruits to the West country club by the Football League.

References

Algerian Ligue Professionnelle 1 seasons
Algeria
1